Working Class Boy may refer to:

 Working Class Boy (memoir), a 2016 memoir by Australian rock singer Jimmy Barnes
 Working Class Boy (film), a 2018 documentary based on the memoir of the same name
 Working Class Boy (soundtrack), the soundtrack album of the 2018 film